Jabatos de Nuevo León (or Club de Fútbol Nuevo León) is a former Mexican football club which started in 1957 in the Ascenso MX, Mexico's second division of football. The club played in the top tier Liga MX and various lower divisions until about 1990, when lagging fan attendance competition was presented by two other professional clubs in Nuevo León, C.F. Monterrey and Tigres de la UANL.

History
The club was founded in 1957 by local business owners Lauro Leal, César M. Saldaña, Manolo Pando y Ramón Pedroza Langarica, they had previously bought second division team Deportivo Anáhuac. They made their second division debut and inaugural win against Reboceros De La Piedad on July 13, 1958. Carlos Guerrero scored the only goal, giving the club its first win. Their inaugural at home win was on July 20, 1958 against Querétaro FC, 4–3. In 1959–1960, the club was sold to the UANL Tigres due to financial problems.

At the end of 1962, club was acquired by Sergio Salinas, who brought back the club's name and colors. The club made its return to the second division in the Estadio Tecnológico against C.F. Pachuca, winning 4–2. After tying in first place in the league with Jaiba Brava del Tampico, they won a tie-breaking match in the Estado de Martinica, earning the Jabatos a place in the Liga MX. Directed by Paulino Sanchez and Alberto Etcheverry, the Jabatos made their presentation in the first division in the 1966–67 season and would end the season in sixth general place. On July 24, 1967 they gained the inaugural victory in the recently opened Estadio Universitario in a friendly match against Mexico national football team. The stadium was opened 30 of May 1967 with a tie between Monterrey and Athletic of Madrid, later the Jabatos tied 1–1 with Sheffield United.

The club's prowess fell, losing 10–2 on January 14, 1968 to Guadalajara. The club remained in the first division until the 1968–69 season, descending after playing a three-game relegation tournament in the Estadio Azteca, 1–1, 2–2, and 1–0 in favor of the Club Oro. In order to ascend again, the team maintained nearly the same lineup in the 1969–70 season of the Second Division. This did not play out as planned, and the team was last of the second division and relegated to Third division. At the time, northern Mexico had yet to be established a third division due to financial prohibition. Disappearing for the 1971–72 season, the Jabatos returned in the 1973–74 season and began the third division in the north. They played in the third division until the season 1978–79, when they disappeared for a third time.

The Rivero brothers revived the club for the 1987–88 in Serie B. The Jabatos carried the league in its first season, obtained the title and ascending to the next league. In the 1988–89 season, the team played at the Serie A national league but lost to Venados F.C., and did not promote. Lacking sponsor support in Monterrey, the Rivero brothers sold the franchise to Grupo Botanas Leo. It was transferred to Saltillo and the Jabatos name was retired when they were renamed "Leones de Saltillo".

Primera División de México statistics 

 GP – Games Played
 W – Wins
 D – Draws
 L – Loss
 GF – Goals in favor
 GC – Goals Against
 Pts – Points
 DIF – Difference

Distinctions
Segunda División Profesional (1): 1965–1966
Segunda "B" (1): 1987–1988

See also
Morelos
C.F. Monterrey
Tigres de la UANL
Nuevo León

Footnotes

Football clubs in Monterrey
Association football clubs established in 1957
Defunct football clubs in Mexico
1957 establishments in Mexico